Helen Shaw may refer to:

 Helen Shaw (politician) (1879–1964), Unionist Party politician in Scotland
 Helen Shaw (actress) (1897–1997), American actress
 Helen Shaw (writer) (1913–1985), New Zealand short-story writer, poet and editor